Navas de Jorquera is a municipality in the city of Albacete, Province of Albacete, Castile-La Mancha, Spain. It has a population of 549.

Municipalities of the Province of Albacete